Devan is a 2002 Indian Tamil-language action film directed by Arun Pandian making his debut as director. The film stars himself in the title role being his 50th project as actor with Meena and Kausalya , while Vivek and Malayalam actor Sai Kumar play supporting roles. Actors Vijayakanth, Karthik and Senthil  appear in guest appearances. Sai Kumar had made his Tamil debut with this film. The music was composed by Ilaiyaraaja. The film was released on 14 June 2002 and was also dubbed in Hindi as Vidrohi.

Plot
The movie opens with Alex Devan murdering photographer Jeeva in cold blood in the latter's house. Jeeva strategically positions a video camera to capture the impending murder, but Devan's face is not captured on it. Jeeva shouts out the name of his killer before dying, but the audio is lost at that point.

While the police search for the killer, Devan zeroes in on Chetta Raghu as his next target. He follows Chetta to Chandigarh but is apprehended by CBI officer Rathnavel. Rathnavel is a tasked with bringing down hoarders and black marketers of India's staple grains. Once Rathnavel realises that Chetta is a mastermind of the hoarding operation, he begins to help Devan, even hiring successful lawyer Chakravarthy to fight for him.

The flashback shows that Devan's sister Jacqueline was killed by Chetta. Earlier, Chetta and Devan were friends, but Chetta stalks and harasses Jacqueline. He peeps on her when she is bathing, and when she finds out about it, she slaps him in public. Chetta decides to take revenge. On Jacqueline's wedding day, he drugs her and sends her to church in the bridal costume with no dress underneath. Chetta then grabs her costume from the car, thus rendering her completely naked in public. He then shoots her and her groom. Devan is framed for the crime and wants to avenge his sister's death.

In the end, Chetta is killed.

Cast

 Arun Pandian as Alex Devan (Jackson)
 Meena as Uma
 Kausalya as Jacqueline, Devan's sister
 Vijayakanth as Rathnavel IPS, Deputy Director CBI (guest appearance)
 Karthik as Lawyer Chakravarthy (guest appearance)
 Vivek as Saravanan
 Sai Kumar as Chetta Raghu
 Chandrasekhar as Chandran
 Senthil as Police officer (guest appearance)
 Vijayan as the Police inspector
 Thalaivasal Vijay as Jeeva
 Pandu as Kaalimuthu
 Vinu Chakravarthy as Politician
 Karikalan as Inspector Ravikumar
 Ajay Rathnam as Police Officer
 Rajmohan as Shiva
 Nandha as Nandha
 Mohan Raman as Anantharaman
 Bayilvan Ranganathan as Parrot astrologer
 Kovai Senthil as a Company worker
 Marthandan as a Company worker
 Citizen Mani as Mani
 Boys Rajan as Travel agent
 Mudhalvan Rajendran as the Police inspector
 Srilatha as a Company worker
 Minnal Deepa as Bhavana

Production
The film was Arun Pandian's 100th film as actor and debut film as director. The climax scene was shot in Kakinada, Andhra Pradesh, at the harbour, where underwater sequences were shot, using helicopters and ships, 3000 tractors, 50 buses, and 200 camels. Says Arun Pandian, "It's a story that I penned about 10 years back. Earlier when I casually talked to Vijayakanth about my intention of directing a film he had said that he would definitely act whenever I directed it. I reminded him of it and he promptly agreed. He was confident and didn't have any apprehension that I being the actor-director would give more footage to myself!".

Soundtrack
The soundtrack and background score were composed by music director Ilaiyaraaja.

Critical reception
Balaji wrote:"though the movie starts off impressively, it eventually turns into a cliche-ridden outing filled with sentiments, revenge and action". Another reviewer wrote:"An interesting screenplay, with suspense, action, vendetta and patriotism weaved in, the male characters are well-etched, and the female characters given just enough scope to justify their presence in the film. Only that the film is a bit too lengthy and could have been trimmed a little". Chennaionline.com wrote "‘Devan’ is an impressive debut by actor-turned-director Arun Pandian".

References

External links
 

2002 films
Films scored by Ilaiyaraaja
2000s Tamil-language films
Indian films about revenge
Indian action thriller films
2002 directorial debut films
Central Bureau of Investigation in fiction
Fictional portrayals of the Tamil Nadu Police
Films shot in Andhra Pradesh
Films set in Punjab, India
Films set in Odisha
Fictional portrayals of the Delhi Police
Films set in Tamil Nadu
Films about corruption in India
Films set in Delhi
Films about journalists
Fictional journalists and mass media people
2002 action thriller films